This is a list of the heritage sites in  as recognized by the South African Heritage Resources Agency. For performance reasons, the following districts have been split off:

 List of heritage sites in Colesberg
 List of heritage sites in Kimberley
 List of heritage sites in Richmond
 List of heritage sites in Victoria West

|}

References 

Tourist attractions in the Northern Cape
Northern Cape
Heritage sites